The Lady from Long Acre is a 1918 romance novel by the British writer Victor Bridges. It was published in the United States the following year.

Adaptations
In 1921 it was adapted into an American silent film The Lady from Longacre directed by George Marshall and starring William Russell and Mary Thurman. It was remade as a 1925 film Greater Than a Crown directed by Roy William Neill and starring Edmund Lowe and Dolores Costello. Both versions were produced by Fox Film.

References

Bibliography
 Goble, Alan. The Complete Index to Literary Sources in Film. Walter de Gruyter, 1999.
 Reilly, John M. Twentieth Century Crime & Mystery Writers. Springer, 2015.
 Wlaschin, Ken. Silent Mystery and Detective Movies: A Comprehensive Filmography. McFarland, 2009.

1918 British novels
British romance novels
Novels set in London
British novels adapted into films
Novels by Victor Bridges
Mills & Boon books